Lawrence Wolfe was an American football and basketball coach. He served as the head coach in both sports at Linfield College and Oregon Normal School—known as Western Oregon University. Wolfe was the head football coach at Linfield from 1926 to 1927, compiling a record of 8–7–2. He was head football coach Oregon Norma from 1928 to 1934, tallying a mark of 41–13–4.

Wolfe is credited with inspiring the Oregon Normal's "Wolf" mascot.

Head coaching record

Football

References

Year of birth missing
Year of death missing
Linfield Wildcats football coaches
Linfield Wildcats men's basketball coaches
Western Oregon Wolves football coaches
Western Oregon Wolves men's basketball coaches